The 2022 Texas gubernatorial election took place on November 8, 2022, to elect the governor of Texas. Incumbent Republican governor Greg Abbott won re-election to a third term, defeating Democratic nominee and former Congressman, Beto O'Rourke. All statewide elected offices are currently held by Republicans. In his previous gubernatorial race in 2018, Abbott won with 55.8% of the vote.

The Democratic and Republican primaries were held on March 1, 2022. O'Rourke and Abbott won outright majorities in their respective primaries, and therefore did not participate in the May 24 runoffs.

Texas has not voted for a Democratic candidate for governor since Ann Richards in 1990. Additionally, Abbott had a strong approval rating on election day, with 55% of voters approving to 45% disapproving. Beto O'Rourke, who gained national attention in 2018 for his unusually close and competitive campaign against Senator Ted Cruz, was widely viewed as a rising star in the Texas Democratic Party and potential challenger for Abbott, but a failed run for President of the United States in 2020 prompted criticisms of opportunism, via Republican attempts to brand him as anti-law enforcement and his former comments on guns.

Abbott won re-election by 10.9%, which is a margin slightly smaller than his 13.3% in 2018 in spite of a much redder national climate in 2022, making this the closest gubernatorial election in Texas since 2006, and the closest election of Abbott's entire political career since his first race for the Texas Supreme Court in 1998. Beto O'Rourke, meanwhile, performed 8.3% worse than his 2018 Senate run, but still won the highest share for a Democratic gubernatorial candidate since Ann Richards received 45.88% in her unsuccessful reelection bid against George W. Bush in 1994. Abbott's raw vote total was less than his 4.65 million in 2018, while O'Rourke set a record of most raw votes for a Texas Democratic gubernatorial candidate at around 3.55 million, but was also less than his 4.04 million vote total in the 2018 Senate race.

Abbott carried 235 out of 254 counties in his re-election victory, flipping the heavily Hispanic counties of Culberson and Zapata and becoming the first Republican gubernatorial candidate to win the latter in the state's history (though Zapata had voted Republican in the 2020 presidential election), while O'Rourke became the first Democratic gubernatorial candidate to win the county of Fort Bend since 1974. O'Rourke outperformed Joe Biden two years prior among Latino voters, though his performance with them was still worse than past nominees.

Republican primary
On June 4, 2021, Texas Republican Party chairman Allen West announced his resignation as party chair. West criticized Gov. Greg Abbott's handling of the COVID-19 pandemic in Texas. The history of conflict between West and Abbott included a lawsuit by West and other Republicans challenging Abbott's extension of the early voting period in 2020, as well as a protest outside the Governor's Mansion over pandemic-related shutdowns as well as mask mandates. On July 4, 2021, West announced that he would challenge Abbott in the 2022 gubernatorial primary. Both West and fellow gubernatorial candidate Don Huffines were considered more conservative than Abbott. On March 1, 2022, Abbott won the Republican primary by a smaller margin than in 2018.

Candidates

Nominee
Greg Abbott, incumbent governor

Eliminated in primary
Paul G. Belew, criminal defense attorney
Danny Harrison, businessman
Kandy Kaye Horn, philanthropist
Don Huffines, former member of the Texas Senate
Ricky Lynn Perry, staffing agency employee
Chad Prather, BlazeTV talk show host, activist, and stand-up comedian
 Allen West, former chair of the Texas Republican Party and former U.S. representative for

Withdrawn
 Martin Holsome, former Rusk city councillor
Kurt Schwab, military veteran

Declined
George P. Bush, Texas Land Commissioner and member of the Bush family (ran for Attorney General)
Christi Craddick, Texas Railroad Commissioner
Glenn Hegar, Texas Comptroller of Public Accounts (running for re-election)
Sid Miller, Texas Agriculture Commissioner (running for re-election)
Rick Perry, former governor and former U.S. Secretary of Energy
Joe Straus, former Speaker of the Texas House of Representatives

Endorsements

Polling
Graphical summary

Results

Democratic primary

Candidates

Nominee

Eliminated in primary
Inocencio Barrientez, fitness trainer
Michael Cooper, pastor, candidate for lieutenant governor in 2018, and candidate for U.S Senate in 2020
Joy Diaz, reporter
Rich Wakeland, former advisor to Public Utility Commissioner Ken Anderson

Disqualified
Jack Daniel Foster Jr., teacher
R. Star Locke, veteran

Declined 
Steve Adler, Mayor of Austin
Julián Castro, former U.S. Secretary of Housing and Urban Development, former Mayor of San Antonio, and candidate for President of the United States in 2020
 Lina Hidalgo, Harris County Judge

Endorsements

Polling

Results

Green primary

Candidates

Declared 
 Delilah Barrios, environmental activist

Libertarian convention

Candidates

Declared
Mark Jay Tippetts, attorney, former Lago Vista city councilman, and nominee for governor in 2018

Withdrew/disqualified
Dan Behrman, software engineer, internet personality, candidate for Texas House of Representatives in 2014, and candidate for President of the United States in 2020
Andrew Jewell, industrial maintenance technician, Secretary of Libertarian Party of Dallas County, Chair of Texas Libertarian Party Radical Caucus, and candidate for Dallas County Commissioner District 3 in 2020.

Independents and other parties

Candidates

Declared
 Deirdre Dickson-Gilbert, public educator (previously ran for Democratic nomination)
 Ricardo Turullols-Bonilla, retired educator and write-in candidate for U.S. Senate in 2020

Disqualified
Patrick Wynne, software engineer, data scientist and U.S. Navy veteran (Reform Party)

Declined
Matthew McConaughey, Academy Award-winning actor (no declared party affiliation)

General election

Predictions

Debates

Endorsements

Polling
Aggregate polls

Graphical summary

Greg Abbott vs. Julián Castro

Greg Abbott vs. Beto O'Rourke with Matthew McConaughey as an independent

Greg Abbott vs. Don Huffines

Greg Abbott vs. Matthew McConaughey

Greg Abbott vs. generic Democrat

Greg Abbott vs. generic opponent

Results

By congressional district
Abbott won 25 of 38 congressional districts

Analysis 
While Texas Democrats hoped for Beto O'Rourke to achieve an upset over the incumbent Greg Abbott, one did not materialize. Abbott won by about 10.9 points, a margin slightly larger than aggregate polling, but virtually in line with the last poll conducted. He won the vast majority of counties, mostly rural, and by significantly wide margins. 34 counties, in particular, gave Abbott over 90% of the vote, the most by any Texas Republican gubernatorial candidate, and the most for any candidate since Democrat Allan Shivers' 1954 re-election.

He won several mid-sized metro areas which include Corpus Christi along the coastal bend; Beaumont–Port Arthur, Tyler and Longview in East Texas; Lubbock and Midland-Odessa in West Texas; and Amarillo in the Panhandle. Abbott also did well in the suburbs of the Texas Triangle, winning Brazoria, Galveston, and Montgomery counties around Houston; Comal and Guadalupe around San Antonio; Collin, Denton, Ellis, Kaufman, Rockwall, and Tarrant in the Dallas-Fort Worth metroplex; and Williamson in Greater Austin. In DFW and Austin specifically, Republican strength has collapsed much faster in these metros than anywhere else in Texas, with Abbott carrying Collin, Denton, Tarrant, and Williamson by 10.07%, 12.81%, 4.11%, and 0.62% respectively, down from his margins of 19.48%, 20.60%, 10.64%, and 10.71% from 2018.

O'Rourke, despite his loss, did best in Texas's urban centers. He carried Travis, home to the state capital Austin (72.6% - 25.9%), his best performance in the state; El Paso, his home county, 63.4% - 35%; Dallas (62.8% - 35.9%); Bexar (57.5% - 41.1%); and Harris (54% - 44.5%). He also carried Hays, a rapidly growing county south of Austin which contains San Marcos and Texas State University, by 54.5% - 43.7%. Despite improving on 2018 nominee Lupe Valdez's margins in these counties, he did worse in all of them compared to his Senate campaign in 2018, and, excluding Travis and Hays, worse than Joe Biden in the 2020 presidential race but that was chiefly because Greg Abbott had been much more popular than Donald Trump in the state. The only county O'Rourke flipped was suburban Fort Bend outside Houston, which voted for Abbott by 0.2% in 2018, but voted for O'Rourke by 4.68% in this election.

Outside the Texas Triangle and Trans Pecos, the only other area O'Rourke won was the heavily Hispanic Rio Grande Valley along the U.S. border with Mexico, but his performance was worse than Valdez's and his own from 2018, which continued the trend of rural Hispanic voters away from the Democrats towards Republicans, but did slightly outperform Biden from 2020. Counties that voted for Biden by single digits like Duval (2.61%), Starr (5%), and Maverick (9.45%); voted for O'Rourke 11.02%, 17.85%, and 17.68% respectively. Despite this improvement from the 2020 presidential race, Abbott flipped two heavily Hispanic counties, Zapata and Culberson (in the Trans Pecos).

Exit polls according to NBC News showed Abbott winning male (58% - 41%) and female voters (51% - 48%), whites (66% - 33%), voters over 45 (60% - 39%), college graduates (52% - 47%) and non-college graduates (56% - 43%), and voters who denied the results of the 2020 presidential election (94% - 5%). O'Rourke won black voters (84% - 15%), Latinos (57% - 40%), Asians (52% - 48%), voters between 18-44 (54% - 44%), Independents (49%-47%) and moderates (60% - 38%).

Fox News Voter Analysis exit polls showed Abbott winning male (59%-39%) and female voters (51%-48%); whites (68%-30%); voters over 45 (61%-37%); college graduates (54%-44%), non-college graduates (56%-43%) and other minorities (53%-42%); white men (70%-28%); white women (67%-32%). O'Rourke won African Americans (81%-18%), Latinos (56%-42%); African American men (76%-24%); African American women (85%-13%) and Latina women (61%-37%). O'Rourke also won Latino men (55%-45%). Fox News Voter Analysis

See also
2022 United States House of Representatives elections in Texas
2022 United States gubernatorial elections
2022 Texas State Senate election
2022 Texas House of Representatives election
2022 Texas elections

Notes

Partisan clients

References

External links 
Official campaign websites
 Greg Abbott (R) for Governor
 Delilah Barrios (G) for Governor
 Deirdre Gilbert (I) for Governor
 Beto O'Rourke (D) for Governor
 Mark Tippetts (L) for Governor

2022
Gubernatorial
Texas
Beto O'Rourke